Billie Jean Moffitt and Karen Susman successfully defended their title, defeating Sandra Price and Renée Schuurman in the final, 5–7, 6–3, 7–5 to win the ladies' doubles tennis title at the 1962 Wimbledon Championships.

Seeds

  Maria Bueno /  Darlene Hard (semifinals)
  Billie Jean Moffitt /  Karen Susman (champions)
  Justina Bricka /  Margaret Smith (semifinals)
  Sandra Price /  Renée Schuurman (final)

Draw

Finals

Top half

Section 1

Section 2

Bottom half

Section 3

Section 4

References

External links

Women's Doubles
Wimbledon Championship by year – Women's doubles
Wimbledon Championships
Wimbledon Championships